Harline is a surname. Notable people with the surname include:

Craig Harline, American historian of religion
Leigh Harline (1907–1969), American film composer and songwriter